Samuel Pena is an American former mayor of Maywood, California, United States.

Pena was elected to the Maywood City Council in 1999 and was the city's mayor in 1999-2003 and in 2005–2006. He was also Chairman of the Maywood Redevelopment Agency in 2003-2005 and was the City Clerk from 1993–1999.

Pena graduated from UCLA with a Bachelor's degree, majoring in Political Science, and is a Community Certified Transportation Manager from the National Community Transportation Association of America.

References

Living people
Mayors of places in California
People from Maywood, California
Year of birth missing (living people)